The Amica Temple of Radiance is a new religious movement begun in 1959 in Los Angeles by Roland Hunt and Dorothy Bailey based on the teachings of Ivah Bergh Whitten.

Whitten had been as a child diagnosed with a disease considered incurable which she claims had been cured by her "color awareness". She began to teach her system, with her first course published in 1932.

The Temple continues and expands on Whitten's teachings. These teachings include that each color is an aspect of existence, and individually ruled by a master. By coming to understand which color ray an individual was born under, that individual can discern their proper work and place in life. She also taught that each color ray has a different healing potential.

The Temple currently offers lessons in "color awareness" to students across the country in centers located in California and Washington.

The current leader of Washington Temple is Paola Hugh.

References
Lewis, James R. The Encyclopedia of Cults, Sects, and New Religions. Amherst, NY: Prometheus Books, 1998. .

Religious organizations established in 1959
New religious movements
Churches in Los Angeles